The Missing Leech (real name Maurici Ribera) is an anti folk musician from Sant Joan de Vilatorrada in Barcelona, Spain. He has performed hundreds on concerts worldwide with artists such as Daniel Johnston and The Wave Pictures. In 2015, he released a movie titled "The Unfinished Story of the Missing Leach" about the Catalan antifolk scene.

References

External links
The Missing Leech Official Website
The Missing Leech Official Blog
Primavera Sound - Festival where The Missing Leech is playing with photos and info about the artist 

Musicians from Barcelona
Year of birth missing (living people)
Living people